Jovita may refer to:

People
 Jovita Carranza (born 1949), American businesswoman, 44th Treasurer of the United States 
 Jovita Delaney (born 1974), Irish camogie player 
 Jovita Feitosa (1848–1867), Brazilian soldier
 Jovita Fontanez, American public official
 Jovita Fuentes (1895–1978), Filipina singer
 Jovita González (1904–1983), American folklorist, educator, and writer
 Jovita Idar (1885–1946), American journalist, political activist and civil rights worker
 Jovita Laurušaitė (born 1956), Lithuanian painter and ceramist
 Jovita Moore (1967–2021), American television news anchor
 Jovita Virador, Filipino domestic worker who was one of the murder victims of the Andrew Road triple murders

Other
 921 Jovita, asteroid
 Faustinus and Jovita, saints
 Jovita (railcar)
 Jovita, Córdoba, town in Argentina
 Lake Jovita; see San Antonio, Florida